Oru Kuttanadan Blog  is an Indian Malayalam language comedy film directed and written by Sethu. The film marks Sethu's directorial debut and stars Mammootty, Shamna Kasim, Raai Laxmi, Anu Sithara, Ananya, Adil Ibrahim, Sunny Wayne, Jacob Gregory, Lalu Alex, and Nedumudi Venu. The background music was composed by Bijibal. Story is set in the backdrop of Kuttanad. The movie was released on 14 September 2018.

Plot
Mammootty plays the role of Hari, an influential character in the area. The movie narrates the story of Hari and the people in his hometown, Krishnapuram.

Cast

 Mammootty as Nediyedath Hari
 Shamna Kasim as SI Neena Kurup
 Lalu Alex as G.P Nair, Panchayat President
 Raai Laxmi as Sreejaya 
 Anu Sithara as Hema
 Sreevidya Mullachery as Maya
 Nedumudi Venu as Nediyedath Hari's father
 Sanju Sivram as Sudhy
 Jayan Cherthala as Paul
 Swasika as Sujatha
 Sunny Wayne as Gopan
 Ananya as Gopan's wife
 Jacob Gregory as Tony
 Shaheen Siddique as Rameshan
 Vivek Gopan
 Thankachan Vithura
 Sohan Seenulal as Peter 
 Adil Ibrahim as Rahul Bhanuprasad
 Kalabhavan Haneef as Varkky
 Jude Anthany Joseph as Prakashan
 Arun V. Narayan as Binu
 Prasanth as Pauly
 Shaju as Shaju
 Balaji Sarma as Pambadi Vijayan
 Adham Ayub 
 Ponnamma Babu
 Thesni Khan
 Karthik Vishnu as Senthil Senthamarakshan
 Rajasekharan (Xavier- Saevi)
 Indu Thampy- cameo appearance
 Vineeth Kumar - cameo appearance
 Binny Tom

Production
The film was initially titled Kozhi Thankachan, it was later changed to Oru Kuttanadan Blog. Shoot of the movie began in March 2018. The film is set in Kuttanad.

Box office
The film was a failure at the box office. It cost 8 crore to make and has reportedly grossed  3.5 crore worldwide in its final run.

References

2018 films
Indian comedy-drama films
2010s Malayalam-language films
2018 comedy-drama films